Thirunindravur is a neighbourhood situated on the western part of Chennai, Tamil Nadu, India. It is located around 29 km from Chennai Central railway station. Thirunindravur comes under Chennai Metropolitan Area. The neighbourhood is served by Thirunindravur railway station. It is famous for its temples. Thiruninravur lake serves the neighbourhood for its water needs.  It serves as the connecting hub between Chennai and Tirupati.

History
The name Thiruninravur comes from the Tamil words Thiru, nindra and vur. The Tamil word Thiru represents the name for the Hindu god Perumal. Nindra refers to stood and vur refers to a village or a place. It is said that Lakshmi was travelling through the sky and saw this beautiful village and stood here; she wondered how beautiful is this village. Thus the place came to be known as Thiru-ninra-vur, the village where Lakshmi-Narayana stood.  Here there are two ancient temples which are written in the history of Tamil literature. As moonlight comes on to the temple Gopura it is special for many occasions.

This location is also the home town of Pusalar, the Nayanar saint.

Demographics
 India census, Thiruninravur had a population of 37095. Males constitute 50% of the population and females 50%. Thirunindravur has an average literacy rate of 91%, higher than the national average of 74%: male literacy is 95%, and female literacy is 88.6%.

Famous places
Thiruninravur is famous for Hridayaleeswarar Temple and Bakthavatsala Perumal Temple is one of the 108 Divyadesams.
Hridayaleeswarar Temple Pusalar Nayanar constructed the temple in his heart that design is physically constructed by Mahindra Pallava 1500 years ago by the order of Lord Shiva. Both the temples were built in Pallava era.
Many devotees from in and around Chennai, Thiruvallur and Kanchipuram regularly visit these temples. We can find good rush in Bakthavatsala Perumal Temple on Vaikunta Ekadasi and Hridayaleeswarar Temple during Prathosham days. Both the temples are historic, and are well maintained.

Roadways
The Outer Ring Road  which is being laid in order to connect Vandalur to Ennore is being routed via Thiruninravur (Nemilichery) and more other places. The present National Highway - NH205 passes through Thiruninravur and also referred to as MTH road or CTH road. The phase I from Vandalur to Nemelicherry (Thirunindravur) has been completed and is available for traffic. The new Outer Ring road makes commutation much faster and easier for the private vehicle drivers, avoiding many traffic, to reach Poonamallee, Tambaram, Airport center much sooner than before.

The Tamil Nadu Highways department issued a GO on 4 October 2013 to extending the entire Chennai - Tirutani highway to 6 lanes at a cost of 168 Cr. The first phase will involve extending the road to 4 lanes - 100 ft with center median and encroachments have already started to be removed. Residents and Resident welfare associations have welcomed this move..

Colleges and schools
 Government Higher Secondary School, Gomatipuram
 Amutha Matriculation School 
 Hindu College 
Jaya Engineering College
 Jaya College of Arts and Science
 Jaya College of Pharmacy
Jaya Teacher Training Institute
Jaya Matriculation Higher Secondary school
Jaya Matriculation Higher Secondary school (Krishna Puram)
Grace Park Convent Matriculation Higher Secondary school
St.John's Matriculation Higher Secondary school
Angel Matriculation Higher Secondary school
Oxford Matriculation Higher Secondary school
Oxford Public School
Dasar Higher Secondary school
Claret Matriculation Higher Secondary school
Vivekananda Matriculation School.

Area developments 
The new Tidel Park Phase II is the main highlight and new landmark near to this city.

References

External links
 www.thiruninravur.org
 www.thirunindravur.in

Neighbourhoods in Chennai